The American is an American comic book series published in 1987 by Dark Horse Comics.

The American continued for eight regular issues, a special, a miniseries, and occasional stories in anthologies, through the mid-1990s. A collection of all the lead character's appearances was published in 2005. It was written by Mark Verheiden.

Premise

Since the 1950s, The American has been a symbol of hope and strength for the American people. When a reporter decides to write a story about this apparently indestructible one man army, he discovers everything is not as it appears.

Awards
It was nominated for the 1988 Eisner Award for "Best New Series".

References

External links
 http://www.comicon.com/cgi-bin/ultimatebb.cgi?ubb=get_topic;f=39;t=000233

The American at International Hero
The American at Don Markstein's Toonopedia. Archived from the original on April 4, 2012.

1987 comics debuts
Superhero comics
American superheroes
Dark Horse Comics titles
United States-themed superheroes